Authentic Socialist Party may refer to:

 Authentic Socialist Party (Argentina)
 Authentic Socialist Party (Senegal)